Disq is an American indie rock band from Madison, Wisconsin.

History
Disq began while bassist/vocalist Raina Bock and guitarist/vocalist Isaac deBroux-Slone were in middle school. In 2016, Disq independently released their first project, an EP titled Disq 1. After this release, the band returned in 2020 as a five-piece, now featuring keyboardist/guitarist Shannon Conor, guitarist Logan Severson and drummer Brendan Manley, having signed to Saddle Creek Records. The band announced their debut album in 2020 titled Collector. The album received positive reviews. In mid 2022, Disq announced their second full-length album, Desperately Imagining Somewhere Quiet. The album was released on October 7, 2022.

References

Saddle Creek Records artists
Musical groups from Wisconsin
American indie rock groups